Mort Street is a road in Civic, the city centre of Canberra, Australia. It passes through the city centre's main bus interchange, and continues into the commercial precinct in the suburb of Braddon. 

Several Commonwealth Government agency offices are located on the street, including the Australian Crime Commission, the Australian Transport Safety Bureau, and the Department of Education, Employment and Workplace Relations.

The southern end of Mort Street is closed to most motor traffic and forms part of the City Interchange. The northern Braddon section is home to the popular Knightsbridge Penthouse cocktail bar, Cornocopia Bakery, art supply stores, a yoga studio, and a couple of hairdressing salons. The street is also home to the Telstra exchange and several building sites.

See also

References

Further reading

Streets in Canberra